This is a list of notable works of dystopian literature. A dystopia is an unpleasant (typically repressive) society, often propagandized as being utopian. The Encyclopedia of Science Fiction states that dystopian works depict a negative view of "the way the world is supposedly going in order to provide urgent propaganda for a change in direction."

18th century 

 Gulliver's Travels (1726) by Jonathan Swift

19th century 

 The Last Man (1826) by Mary Shelley
 A Sojourn in the City of Amalgamation, in the Year of Our Lord, 19-- (1835) by Oliver Bolokitten
The Tragedy of Man (1862) by Imre Madách
 Paris in the Twentieth Century (1863) by Jules Verne
 Notes from Underground (1864) by Fyodor Dostoevsky
 The History of a Town (1870) by Mikhail Saltykov-Shchedrin
 Vril, the Power of the Coming Race (1871) by Edward Bulwer-Lytton, originally printed as The Coming Race
 Erewhon (1872) by Samuel Butler
 The Begum's Fortune (1879) by Jules Verne
 The Fixed Period (1882) by Anthony Trollope
 The Republic of the Future (1887) by Anna Bowman Dodd
 The Inner House (1888) by Walter Besant
 Caesar's Column (1890) by Ignatius L. Donnelly
 Pictures of the Socialistic Future (1891) by Eugen Richter
 "The Repairer of Reputations" (1895) by Robert W. Chambers
 The Time Machine (1895) by H. G. Wells
 When The Sleeper Wakes (1899) by H. G. Wells

20th century

1900s 

 The First Men in the Moon (1901) by H. G. Wells
 The Purple Cloud (1901) by M. P. Shiel
 The Iron Heel (1908) by Jack London
 Lord of the World (1908) by Robert Hugh Benson
 The Machine Stops (1909) by E. M. Forster
 Trylogia Księżycowa or The Lunar Trilogy (1911) by Jerzy Żuławski

1910s 

 The Night Land (1912) by William Hope Hodgson
 When William Came (1913) by Saki as a future history, this is among the earliest of Pax Germanica genre
 Meccania, the Super-State (1918) by "Owen Gregory"(pseudonym)
 The Heads of Cerberus (1919) by "Francis Stevens" (Gertrude Barrows Bennett)

1920s 

 R.U.R.: Rossum's Universal Robots (1921) by Karel Čapek
 We (1921) by Yevgeny Zamyatin
 Miasto światłości (1924) by Mieczysław Smolarski
 The Trial (1925) by Franz Kafka

1930s 

 The Foundation Pit (1930) by Andrei Platonov
 Brave New World (1932) by Aldous Huxley
 Cat Country (1932/1933) by Lao She
 It Can't Happen Here (1935) by Sinclair Lewis
 War with the Newts (1936) by Karel Čapek
 Swastika Night (1937) by Katharine Burdekin
 Anthem (1938) by Ayn Rand
 Invitation to a Beheading (1938) by Vladimir Nabokov

1940s 

 Darkness at Noon (1940) by Arthur Koestler
 "If This Goes On—" (1940) by Robert A. Heinlein
 Kallocain (1940) by Karin Boye
 The Moon Is Down (1942) by John Steinbeck
 Animal Farm (1945) by George Orwell
 That Hideous Strength (1945) by C. S. Lewis
 Peace In Our Time (1946) by Noël Coward
 Bend Sinister (1947) by Vladimir Nabokov
 Ape and Essence (1948) by Aldous Huxley
 Some Time Never: A Fable for Supermen (1948) by Roald Dahl
 The World of Null-A (1948) by A. E. van Vogt
 Heliopolis (1949) by Ernst Jünger
 Nineteen Eighty-Four (1949) by George Orwell

1950s 

 Player Piano (1952) by Kurt Vonnegut
 The Sound of His Horn (1952) by Sarban
 Fahrenheit 451 (1953) by Ray Bradbury
 Love Among the Ruins (1953) by Evelyn Waugh
 One (1953) by David Karp
 The Space Merchants (1953) by Frederik Pohl and C. M. Kornbluth
 The Caves of Steel (1954) by Isaac Asimov
 Lord of the Flies (1954) by William Golding
 The Chrysalids (1955) by John Wyndham
 The City and the Stars (1956) by Arthur C. Clarke
 Minority Report (1956) by Philip K. Dick
 The World Jones Made (1956) by Philip K. Dick
 Atlas Shrugged (1957) by Ayn Rand
 The Naked Sun (1957) by Isaac Asimov
 The Rise of the Meritocracy (1958) by Michael Young, Baron Young of Dartington
 Alas, Babylon (1959) by Pat Frank
 A Canticle for Leibowitz (1959) by Walter M. Miller Jr.

1960s 

 Dr. Futurity (1960) by Philip K. Dick
 Facial Justice (1960) by L. P. Hartley
 Vulcan's Hammer (1960) by Philip K. Dick
 "Harrison Bergeron" (1961) by Kurt Vonnegut
 Powrót z gwiazd (1961) by Stanisław Lem
 The Old Men at the Zoo (1961) by Angus Wilson
 A Clockwork Orange (1962) by Anthony Burgess
 The Man in the High Castle (1962) by Philip K. Dick 
 The Wanting Seed (1962) by Anthony Burgess
 The Game-Players of Titan (1963) by Philip K Dick
 Planet of the Apes (1963) by Pierre Boulle
 Farnham's Freehold (1964) by Robert A. Heinlein
 Nova Express (1964) by William S. Burroughs
 The Penultimate Truth (1964) by Philip K. Dick
 The Three Stigmata of Palmer Eldritch (1964) by Philip K. Dick
 "Repent, Harlequin!" Said the Ticktockman (1965) by Harlan Ellison
 The Crack in Space (1966) by Philip K. Dick
 The Dream Master (1966) by Roger Zelazny
 Make Room! Make Room! (1966) by Harry Harrison
 Now Wait for Last Year (1966) by Philip K. Dick
 "I Have No Mouth, and I Must Scream" by Harlan Ellison (1967) (post-apocalyptic with elements of dystopia)
 Logan's Run (1967) by William F. Nolan and George Clayton Johnson
 The Time Hoppers (1967) by Robert Silverberg
 The White Mountains (1967) by John Christopher
 Why Call Them Back from Heaven? (1967) by Clifford D. Simak
 A Very Private Life (1968) by Michael Frayn
 Camp Concentration (1968) by Thomas M. Disch
 The City of Gold and Lead (1968) by John Christopher
 Do Androids Dream of Electric Sheep? (1968) by Philip K. Dick
 The Pool of Fire (1968) by John Christopher
 Stand on Zanzibar (1968) by John Brunner
 Synthajoy (1968) by D. G. Compton
 The Jagged Orbit (1969) by John Brunner

1970s 

 Our Friends from Frolix 8 (1970) by Philip K. Dick
 This Perfect Day (1970) by Ira Levin
 The Guardians (1970) by John Christopher
 The Lorax (1971) by Dr. Seuss
 The Lathe of Heaven (1971) by Ursula K. Le Guin
 Los Angeles: AD 2017 (1971) by Phillip Wylie
 The World Inside (1971) by Robert Silverberg
 334 (1972) by Thomas M. Disch
 The Sheep Look Up (1972) by John Brunner
 The Iron Dream (1972) by Norman Spinrad
 The Camp of the Saints (Le Camp des Saints) (1973) by Jean Raspail
 The Ultimate Solution by Eric Norden (1973)
 Flow My Tears, the Policeman Said (1974) by Philip K. Dick
 Walk to the End of the World (1974) by Suzy McKee Charnas
 Dhalgren (1975) by Samuel R. Delany
 The Forever War (1975) by Joe Haldeman
 The Girl Who Owned a City (1975) by O. T. Nelson
 High-Rise (1975) by J. G. Ballard
 The Shockwave Rider (1975) by John Brunner
 Don't Bite the Sun (1976) by Tanith Lee
 Woman on the Edge of Time (1976) by Marge Piercy
 The Dark Tower (1977) – unfinished, attributed to C. S. Lewis, published as The Dark Tower and Other Stories
 A Scanner Darkly (1977) by Philip K. Dick
 The Eye of the Heron (1978) by Ursula K. Le Guin
 SS-GB by Len Deighton (1978)
 The Stand (1978) by Stephen King
 1985 (1978) by Anthony Burgess
 The Turner Diaries (1978) by Andrew Macdonald
 Alongside Night (1979) by J. Neil Schulman
 The Long Walk (1979) by Stephen King under the pseudonym Richard Bachman

1980s 

 Mockingbird (1980) by Walter Tevis
 Riddley Walker (1980) by Russell Hoban
 Lanark: A Life in Four Books (1981) by Alasdair Gray
 Limes inferior (1982) by Janusz Zajdel
 The Running Man (1982) by Stephen King under the pseudonym Richard Bachman
 HaDerekh LeEin Harod (1984) by Amos Kenan. 1984 saw the appearance of the first Israeli dystopian novel, and this one appeared shortly after. Like other Israeli dystopian novels, it is concerned with the religious right taking control of the Jewish state.
 Paradyzja (1984) by Janusz Zajdel
 Sprawl trilogy: Neuromancer (1984) by William Gibson 
 Count Zero (1986) by William Gibson
 Mona Lisa Overdrive (1988) by William Gibson
 Dayworld (1985) by Philip José Farmer
 The Handmaid's Tale (1985) by Margaret Atwood
 In the Country of Last Things (1985) by Paul Auster
 Moscow 2042 (1986) by Vladimir Voinovich
 Sea of Glass (1986) by Barry B. Longyear
 Obernewtyn Chronicles (1987–2008) by Isobelle Carmody
 The Domination (1988) by S. M. Stirling
 When the Tripods Came (1988) by John Christopher
 The Proteus Operation (1985) by James P. Hogan
 The Divide (1980) by William Overgard
 To the Stars trilogy (1980) by Harry Harrison

1990s

Fiction 
 Clash of Eagles (1990) by Leo Rutman
 The Dark Beyond the Stars (1991) by Frank M. Robinson
 Timewyrm: Exodus (Doctor Who novel) (1991) by Terrance Dicks
 The War in 2020 (1991) by Ralph Peters (Pocket Books, 1991)
 The Children of Men (1992) by P. D. James (Faber and Faber, 1992)
 Fatherland by Robert Harris (Hutchinson, 1992)
 Snow Crash (1992) by Neal Stephenson (Bantam Spectra, 1992)
 Parable of the Sower (1993) by Octavia E. Butler (Four Walls Eight Windows, 1993)
 Virtual Light (1993) by William Gibson (Bantam Spectra, 1993)
 Vurt (1993) by Jeff Noon
 The Memory Police (1994) by Yōko Ogawa
 The Diamond Age, or A Young Lady's Illustrated Primer (1994) by Neal Stephenson (Bantam Spectra, 1994)
 Gun, with Occasional Music (1994) by Jonathan Lethem (Harcourt Brace & Co., 1994)
 Amnesia Moon (1995) by Jonathan Lethem
 '48  (1996) by James Herbert
 Attentatet i Pålsjö skog  (1996) by Hans Alfredson
 Infinite Jest  (1996) by David Foster Wallace (Little, Brown, 1996)
 Battle Royale (1999) by Koushun Takami (Ohta Publishing, 1999)
 Forever Free (1999) by Joe Haldeman
 The Ice People (1999) by Maggie Gee (Richard Cohen Books, 1999)

Young adult fiction 

 The Giver (1993) by Lois Lowry (Houghton Mifflin, 1993)
 Shade's Children (1997) by Garth Nix
 Among the Hidden (Shadow Children #1) (1998) by Margaret Peterson Haddix

21st century

2000s

Fiction 

 Ella Minnow Pea (2001) by Mark Dunn (MacAdam/Cage, 2001)
 Feed (2002) by M. T. Anderson (Candlewick Press, 2002)
 In the Presence of Mine Enemies (2003) by Harry Turtledove (2003, the first 21 pages were originally a short story published in 1992)
 Jennifer Government (2003) by Max Barry (Doubleday, 2003)
 Oryx and Crake (2003) by Margaret Atwood (Doubleday, 2003)
 Collaborator (2003) by Murray Davies
 Asphalt (2004) by Carl Hancock Rux (Simon & Schuster, 2004)
 Cloud Atlas (2004) by David Mitchell (Sceptre, 2004)
 The Plot Against America (2004) by Philip Roth (Houghton Mifflin, 2004)
 Divided Kingdom (2005) by Rupert Thomson (Alfred A. Knopf, 2005)
 Never Let Me Go (2005) by Kazuo Ishiguro (Faber and Faber, 2005)
 Armageddon's Children (2006) by Terry Brooks (Del Rey Books, 2006)
 The Book of Dave (2006) by Will Self (Viking Press, 2006)
 Day of the Oprichnik (2006) by Vladimir Sorokin (Zakharov Books, 2006)
 The Road (2006) by Cormac McCarthy (Alfred A. Knopf, 2006)
 Blind Faith (2007) by Ben Elton (Bantam Press, 2007)
 Rant (2007) by Chuck Palahniuk (Doubleday, 2007)
 Last Light (2007) by Alex Scarrow (Orion Publishing Group, 2007)
 Nontraditional Love (2008) by Rafael Grugman (Liberty Publishing House, 2008)
 World Made by Hand (2008) by James Howard Kunstler (Atlantic Monthly Press, 2008)
 Farthing, Ha'penny, and Half a Crown, series by Jo Walton (2006–2008)
 The City & the City (2009) by China Miéville (Del Rey Books, 2009)
 Shades of Grey (2009) by Jasper Fforde (Viking Press, 2009)
 The Windup Girl (2009) by Paolo Bacigalupi (Night Shade Books, 2009)
 The Year of the Flood (2009) by Margaret Atwood (McClelland & Stewart, 2009)
 Z213: Exit (2009) by Dimitris Lyacos (Shoestring Press, 2009)

Young adult fiction 

 Gathering Blue (2000) by Lois Lowry (Houghton Mifflin, 2000)
 Mortal Engines (The Hungry City Chronicles #1) (2001) by Philip Reeve (Scholastic, 2001)
 Noughts and Crosses (2001) by Malorie Blackman (Random House, 2001)
 The House of the Scorpion (2002) by Nancy Farmer (Atheneum Books, 2002)
 Among the Barons (Shadow Children #4) (2003) by Margaret Peterson Haddix (Simon & Schuster, 2003)
 Among the Betrayed (Shadow Children #3) (2003) by Margaret Peterson Haddix (Simon & Schuster, 2003)
 The City of Ember (2003) by Jeanne DuPrau (Random House, 2003)
 Among the Brave (Shadow Children #5) (2004) by Margaret Peterson Haddix (Simon & Schuster, 2004)
 Messenger (2004) by Lois Lowry (Houghton Mifflin, 2004)
 The People of Sparks (2004) by Jeanne DuPrau (Yearling, 2004)
 Among the Enemy (Shadow Children #6) (2005) by Margaret Peterson Haddix (Simon & Schuster, 2005)
 Checkmate (2005) by Malorie Blackman (Random House, 2005)
 Uglies (2005) by Scott Westerfeld (Simon Pulse, 2005)
 Pretties (2005) by Scott Westerfeld (Simon Pulse, 2005)
 Among the Free (Shadow Children #7) (2006) by Margaret Peterson Haddix (Simon & Schuster, 2006)
 Genesis (2006) by Bernard Beckett (Houghton Mifflin Harcourt, 2006)
 Life as We Knew It (2006) by Susan Beth Pfeffer (Harcourt Children's Books, 2006)
 Specials (2006) by Scott Westerfeld (Simon & Schuster, 2006)
 Extras (2007) by Scott Westerfeld (Simon & Schuster, 2007)
 Incarceron (2007) by Catherine Fisher (Hodder & Stoughton, 2007)
 Unwind (2007) by Neal Shusterman (Simon & Schuster, 2007)
 The Host (2008) by Stephenie Meyer (Little, Brown and Company, 2008)
 The Dead and the Gone (2008) by Susan Beth Pfeffer (Harcourt Children's Books, 2008)
 The Declaration (2008) by Gemma Malley (Bloomsbury Publishing, 2008)
 From the New World (2008) by Yusuke Kishi (Kodansha Novels, 2008)
 Gone (2008) by Michael Grant (HarperCollins, 2008)
 The Hunger Games (2008) by Suzanne Collins (Scholastic, 2008)
 The Diamond of Darkhold (2008) by Jeanne DuPrau (Yearling, 2008)
 The Resistance (2008) by Gemma Malley (Bloomsbury Publishing, 2008)
 Sapphique (2007) by Catherine Fisher (Hodder & Stoughton, 2008)
 Catching Fire (2009) by Suzanne Collins (Scholastic, 2009)
 The Forest of Hands and Teeth (2009) by Carrie Ryan (Random House, 2009)
 The Maze Runner (2009) by James Dashner (Delacorte Press, 2009)

2010s

Fiction 

 The Envy Chronicles (series) (2010) by Joss Ware (Avon, 2010–2015)
 The Passage (2010) by Justin Cronin (Ballantine Books, 2010)
 Super Sad True Love Story (2010) by Gary Shteyngart (Random House, 2010)
 Ready Player One (2011) by Ernest Cline (Random House, 2011)
 Shimoneta (2012) by Hirotaka Akagi (Shogakukan, 2012)
 Bleeding Edge (2013) by Thomas Pynchon (Penguin Press, 2013)
 The Bone Season (2013) by Samantha Shannon (Bloomsbury, 2013)
 The Circle (2013) by Dave Eggers (Alfred A. Knopf, 2013)
 MaddAddam (2013) by Margaret Atwood (Nan A. Talese, 2013)
 The Office of Mercy (2013) by Ariel Djanikian (Viking Books, 2013)
 Wool (2013) by Hugh Howey (Simon & Schuster, 2013)
 Dominion (2014) by C. J. Sansom (Mulholland Books, 2014)
 Submission (2015) by Michel Houellebecq (Groupe Flammarion, 2015)
 The Heart Goes Last (2015) by Margaret Atwood (Penguin Random House, 2015)
 Friday Black (2018) by Nana Kwame Adjei-Brenyah (Mariner Books, 2018)
 Tears of the Trufflepig (2019) by Fernando A. Flores (FSG Originals, 2019)
 The Testaments (2019) by Margaret Atwood (Nan A. Talese, 2019)

Young adult fiction 

 Matched (2010) by Ally Condie (Dutton Children's Books, 2010)
 Mockingjay 2010) by Suzanne Collins (Scholastic Corporation, 2010)
 Monsters of Men (2010) by Patrick Ness (Candlewick Press, 2010)
 The Scorch Trials (2010) by James Dashner (Delacorte Press, 2010)
 Across The Universe (2011) by Beth Revis (Razorbill Books, 2011)
 Crossed (2011) by Ally Condie (Dutton Children's Books, 2011)
 The Death Cure (2011) by James Dashner (Delacorte Press, 2011)
 Delirium (2011) by Lauren Oliver (HarperCollins, 2011)
 Divergent (2011) by Veronica Roth (Katherine Tegen Books, 2011)
 Legend (2011) by Marie Lu (G. P. Putnam's Sons, 2011)
 Shatter Me (2011) by Tahereh Mafi (HarperCollins, 2011)
 The Unwanteds (2011) by Lisa McMann (Aladdin Paperbacks, 2011)
 Wither (2011) by Lauren DeStefano (Simon & Schuster Children's Publishing, 2011)
 Article 5 (2012) by Kristen Simmons (Tor Teen, 2012)
 Pandemonium (2012) by Lauren Oliver (HarperCollins, 2012)
 Insurgent (2012) by Veronica Roth (Katherine Tegen Books, 2012)
 The Selection (2012) by Kiera Cass (HarperCollins, 2012)
 Son (2012) by Lois Lowry (Houghton Mifflin, 2012)
 Reached (2012) by Ally Condie (Dutton Children's Books, 2012)
 Revealing Eden (2012) by Victoria Foyt (Sand Dollar Press, Inc., 2012) 
 Under the Never Sky (2012) by Veronica Rossi (HarperCollins, 2012)
 Prodigy (2013) by Marie Lu (G. P. Putnam's Sons, 2013)
 The Elite (2013) by Kiera Cass (HarperCollins, 2013)
 The 5th Wave (2013) by Rick Yancey (Penguin Group, 2013)
 Unravel Me (2013) by Tahereh Mafi (HarperCollins, 2013)
 Allegiant (2013) by Veronica Roth (Katherine Tegen Books, 2013)
 Champion (2013) by Marie Lu (G. P. Putnam's Sons, 2013)
 Reboot (2013) by Amy Tintera (Harper Teen, 2013)
 The Infinite Sea (2014) by Rick Yancey (G.P. Putnam's Sons, 2014)
 Red Rising (2014) by Pierce Brown (Random House LLC, 2014)
 Golden Son (2015) by Pierce Brown (Random House LLC, 2015)
 Red Queen (novel) (2015) by Victoria Aveyard (Harper Teen, 2015)
 Morning Star (2016) by Pierce Brown (Random House LLC, 2016)
 The Last Star (2016) by Rick Yancey (G.P. Putnam's Sons, 2016)
 Scythe (2016) by Neal Shusterman (Simon & Schuster, 2016)
 Iron Gold (2018) by Pierce Brown (Del Rey Books, 2018)

2020s

Young adult fiction 

 The Ballad of Songbirds and Snakes (2020) by Suzanne Collins (Scholastic, 2020)
 Ready Player Two (2020) by Ernest Cline (Ballantine Books, 2020)

See also 

 Lists of dystopian works
 Science fiction
 List of utopian literature

References 

 
Science fiction bibliographies